Michael Silvester (born 4 June 1998) is an Irish rugby union player, currently playing for Pro14 and European Rugby Champions Cup side Leinster. His preferred position is wing or Fullback.

Leinster
Silvester signed an academy contract for Leinster in 2018, becoming a 3rd year academy player in August 2020. He made his Leinster debut in Round 3 of the 2020–21 Pro14 against Zebre.

References

External links
itsrugby.co.uk Profile

1998 births
Living people
Irish rugby union players
Leinster Rugby players
Rugby union wings
Rugby union fullbacks
Rugby union players from Dublin (city)